Poornima Advani is an Indian lawyer, author and social worker. She has served as the chairperson of National Commission for Women (NCW), from January 2002 to January 2005.

Biography
Her mother, Meera Govind Advani is an author. 

Advani holds a doctorate in law from the University of Bombay and a post-graduate diploma in physiotherapy. 

She was a member of the NCW and has written legal and medical publications. She was also a lecturer in the department of law, University of Bombay and also in many global universities, including University of Queensland (Australia), School of Oriental and South African Studies, London; University of East London; and London School of Economics. She is currently a Partner at The Law Point, a national law firm, which she co-founded in the year 2005, along with Mr. B.N. Makhija, Former Principal Advisor, Planning Commission of India.

Publications
She has authored a book titled Indian Judiciary: A Tribute (1997).

Awards
Advani was honoured with the Acharya Tulsi Kartitva Puraskar in 2003.

References

External links
Chairpersons of the National Commission for Women

Living people
Academic staff of the University of Mumbai
Women writers from Maharashtra
University of Mumbai alumni
Indian lecturers
Year of birth missing (living people)